One hundred and fifty-eight Guggenheim Fellowships were awarded in 1950. This marked the 25th anniversary of the fellowship.

1950 U.S. and Canadian Fellows

1950 Latin American and Caribbean Fellows

See also
 Guggenheim Fellowship
 List of Guggenheim Fellowships awarded in 1949
 List of Guggenheim Fellowships awarded in 1951

References

1950
1950 awards